FlipFactory from Telestream is a video transcoding and workflow automation application.  It enables the transfer of media and metadata files between professional video systems, including catch servers, broadcast servers, edit systems, streaming and distribution servers, storage area networks and digital asset management systems.

FlipFactory is used by News Digital Media, and Australian News Corp, to do all their video transcoding.  BBDO New York also uses FlipFactory from Telestream to help them go tapeless.

As of December 2016, FlipFactory is no longer available or supported; Telestream have a new package called "Vantage."

Specifications
Avid and Dolby E workflow integration
Pass through and decoding of Dolby E for broadcast and editing
Avid workflows ingest and deliver media files and metadata in and out of Avid TransferManager Interplay networks
Microsoft IIS7 Smooth Streaming
Loudness correction for ads
HD VANC data preservation and insertion
H.264 closed caption support for IPTV workflows

References
 Technicolor highlights broadcast services at NAB   – David Austerberry – April 22, 2009
 High-Definition Ads Arrive Via IP – Robin Berger – October 1, 2008
 FlipFactory and Launch automation – Marco A. Rivera – May 2008
 Flipping over HD – Claudia Kienzle – January 9, 2008
 Case Study: Simplifying Digital Asset Management – Nancy Davis Kho – December 28, 2007
 Automating the web workflow – David Stewart – October 2007
 Telestream breaks into sports graphics arena – TVB Europe Editor – April 12, 2007

Video conversion software
Classic Mac OS software